Trail of Tears State Forest is a State of Illinois conservation area on  in Union County, Illinois, United States.

Trail of Tears was established in 1929 when Illinois purchased  acres of Shawnee Hills land and used the resulting land to create the Kohn-Jackson Forest (later Union County State Forest).  Soon afterwards, the state park was improved with work performed by the Civilian Conservation Corps.  Subsequent land acquisitions created the  Trail of Tears State Forest of today.  The forest occupies land near the route followed by the Cherokee in December 1838 during their forced relocation in the Trail of Tears.

The nearest town of any size is Jonesboro, Illinois.

See also
 Union County State Fish and Wildlife Area

References

External links

Illinois state forests
Protected areas of Union County, Illinois
Protected areas established in 1929
1929 establishments in Illinois